Hinkle Creek may refer to:
Hinkle Creek (California)
Hinkle Creek (Indiana)
Hinkle Creek (Oregon)